Roadkill is a 1989 Canadian film directed by Bruce McDonald. In a review of the film's soundtrack album, the website AllMusic calls the film "an increasingly weird mix of Heart of Darkness and The Wizard of Oz".

Background
The film was inspired by the Toronto rock band A Neon Rome. McDonald's original idea was to make a concert film following that band on tour; however, the band's lead singer, Neal Arbik, became disillusioned with the demands of touring to promote the band's debut album. His behaviour became increasingly erratic and rebellious over the course of the tour, and he ultimately quit the music industry before the film — or the band's second album — could be made.

Instead, the film became a fictionalized portrayal of A Neon Rome, depicting a band on the verge of collapsing in a similar manner.

Synopsis 
The film stars Valerie Buhagiar as Ramona, an intern at a Toronto record label who is sent to Sudbury by promoter Roy Seth (Gerry Quigley) to track down the label's star band, Children of Paradise, after they disappear on tour. Because she doesn't know how to drive, however, she takes a taxi driven by Buddy (Larry Hudson) for the entire 400-km route.

Once in Sudbury, she finds the band almost immediately, but then loses them again and subsequently tracks them all across Northern Ontario. On her way, she encounters a variety of odd characters — including an indie film director named Bruce Shack (McDonald himself), who documents roadkill on the highway, and an aspiring serial killer named Russell (Don McKellar), who has studied the profession thoroughly but just does not know where to start.

Ramona finally locates the band in Thunder Bay, setting the stage for the film's climax.

Cameo appearances
Music is a large part of the film, and there are cameos by musicians Nash the Slash performing onstage, Leslie Spit Treeo busking on a stretch of land, and Joey Ramone appearing as himself. Shaun Bowring of Teknakuller Raincoats, who appear on the soundtrack, also appears in the film as Mathew, the lead singer of Children of Paradise.

Ramona's parents are played by Valerie's own parents, Nazareno and Giovanna Buhagiar. The bar patron who picks the pocket of the Apocalypse Club Manager after he gets shot is played by the film's producer, Colin Brunton.

Soundtrack album
The film's soundtrack album includes a mix of songs — mostly by Canadian rock artists, but also including a track by The Ramones — and snippets of dialogue from the film:
 "White Lines" I.T.
 "Hinterland" (0:50)
 "Instant Death" (2:58)
 "Mr. Shack Explains" (0:06)
 Leslie Spit Treeo, "The Sound" (2:37)
 "Ramona on the Road" (0:23)
 Graeme Kirkland and the Wolves (feat. Julie Masi), "Street People" (4:51)
 "Spiritual Quest" (0:09)
 Suffer Machine, "Nostradamus" (2:44)
 The Ugly Ducklings, "She Ain't No Use to Me" (3:14)
 "Russell the Serial Killer" (0:30)
 Handsome Ned and the Sidewinders, "Put the Blame on Me" (3:05)
 Steve Munro, "The Weenie Boy Song" (0:40)
 Ten Seconds Over Tokyo, "Burning Rain" (3:53)
 "Thangst for the Angst/Buddy and Biff" (1:02)
 The Paupers, "Magic People" (2:39)
 "Luke" (0:40)
 Teknakuller Raincoats, "Dancing Cadavers" (2:56)
 "The Driving Lessons" (0:29)
 Rita Chiarelli, "Have You Seen My Shoes?" (3:34)
 The Razorbacks, "It's Saturday Night" (3:06)
 "Joey Say Hey" (0:29)
 Ramones, "Howling at the Moon (Sha-La-La)" (3:28)
 "Ramona Gets Ready" (0:19)
 Nash the Slash, "Roadkill" (2:35)
 "Weenie Boy Reprise" (0:22)

Awards
Roadkill won the Toronto-City Award for Best Canadian Feature Film at the 1989 Toronto International Film Festival. Don McKellar was also nominated for two 1990 Genie Awards, for Best Supporting Actor, and Best Original Screenplay.

References

External links
 

1989 films
English-language Canadian films
1980s English-language films
Canadian comedy road movies
1980s road movies
Greater Sudbury in fiction
Films directed by Bruce McDonald
Films set in Northern Ontario
Films shot in Greater Sudbury
1980s Canadian films